Perry Jeter (May 17, 1931 – May 18, 2019) was an American football halfback. He played for the Chicago Bears from 1956 to 1957.

Jeter died of Alzheimer's disease on May 18, 2019, in Steubenville, Ohio at age 88.

Early life 
Jeter graduated from Steubenville High School in Ohio. In a 1950 game against McKinley of Canton, Jeter scored on a 109-yard kickoff return, a still-standing record for the longest touchdown runback in Harding Stadium history.

College career 
Jeter transferred to Cal Poly San Luis Obispo from San Bernardino Valley College. While attending SBVC, Jeter earned junior college All-American accolades as a sophomore.

In December 1955, Jeter was nominated for the Pop Warner Award. Combined from his three seasons with Cal Poly, Jeter finished with 260 carries for 1,740 rushing yards, along with 31 all-purpose touchdowns and numerous point-after conversions.

Professional career 
Jeter was selected by the Bears in the 26th round of the 1955 NFL Draft, with the 311th overall pick.

Chicago executive George Halas commented in 1956: "Jeter is a very elusive runner with good speed. He's a great punt returner and is terrific in the open field."

He went on to play for the Wheeling Ironmen in the United Football League from 1962 to 1963.

References

1931 births
2019 deaths
American football halfbacks
Cal Poly Mustangs football players
Chicago Bears players
Deaths from Alzheimer's disease